Gerald Edward Peckover (born 2 June 1955) is a former Zimbabwean cricketer. He played three One Day Internationals for Zimbabwe at the 1983 Cricket World Cup.

References

1955 births
Living people
Cricketers from Harare
Zimbabwean people of British descent
White Zimbabwean sportspeople
Rhodesia cricketers
Zimbabwe One Day International cricketers
Zimbabwean cricketers
Cricketers at the 1983 Cricket World Cup